Vanraj Bhatia (Hindi: वनराज भाटिया  ; 31 May 1927 – 7 May 2021) was an Indian composer best known for his work in Indian New Wave cinema. He was also one of the leading composers of Western classical music in India.

Bhatia was a recipient of the National Film Award for Best Music Direction for the television film Tamas (1988), the Sangeet Natak Akademi Award for Creative and Experimental Music (1989) and India's fourth-highest civilian honour, the Padma Shri (2012). He died in Mumbai in May 2021.

Biography

Early life and education
Born into a family of Kutchi businessmen, Bhatia attended the New Era School in Bombay and learnt Hindustani classical music as a student at Deodhar School of Music. On hearing Tchaikovsky's Piano Concerto No. 1 as a teenager, he became interested in Western classical music and studied the piano with Dr. Manek Bhagat for four years.

After earning his M.A. (English Honours) from Elphinstone College, University of Bombay in 1949, Bhatia studied composition with Howard Ferguson, Alan Bush and William Alwyn at the Royal Academy of Music, London, where he was a recipient of the Sir Michael Costa Scholarship (1951–54). After graduating with a gold medal in 1954, Bhatia won a Rockefeller Scholarship (1954–58) as well as a French Government Scholarship (1957–58) that allowed him to study with Nadia Boulanger at the Conservatoire de Paris for five years.

Career
On returning to India in 1959, Bhatia became the first person to score music for an advertisement film in India (for Shakti Silk Sarees), and went on to compose over 7,000 jingles, such as Liril, Garden Vareli and Dulux. During this time, he was also a Reader in Western Musicology at the University of Delhi from 1960 to 1965.

Bhatia's first feature film score was for Shyam Benegal's directorial debut Ankur (1974), and he went on to score almost all of Benegal's work, including the song "Mero Gaam Katha Parey" from the film Manthan (1976). Bhatia predominantly worked with filmmakers in the Indian New Wave movement, such as Govind Nihalani (Tamas, which won Bhatia a National Film Award for Best Music Direction), Kundan Shah (Jaane Bhi Do Yaaro), Aparna Sen (36 Chowringhee Lane), Saeed Akhtar Mirza (Mohan Joshi Haazir Ho!), Kumar Shahani (Tarang), Vidhu Vinod Chopra (Khamosh), Vijaya Mehta (Pestonjee) and Prakash Jha (Hip Hip Hurray). In the 1990s, he also composed background scores for mainstream films such as Ajooba, Damini and Pardes.

Bhatia has scored television shows such as Khandaan, Yatra, Wagle Ki Duniya, Banegi Apni Baat and the 53-episode Bharat Ek Khoj based on Jawaharlal Nehru's The Discovery of India, as well as numerous documentaries. He has also released albums of spiritual music on the Music Today label, and composed music for trade fairs such as Expo '70, Osaka and Asia 1972, New Delhi.

Bhatia is the best-known composer of Western classical music in India. His most frequently performed works are the Fantasia and Fugue in C for piano, the Sinfonia Concertante for strings, and the song cycle Six Seasons. His Reverie was performed by Yo-Yo Ma at a concert in Mumbai in January 2019, and the first two acts of his opera Agni Varsha, based on Girish Karnad's play of the same name, premiered in New York City in 2012 in a production by soprano Judith Kellock.

Death 
Bhatia died on May 7, 2021 at his home in Mumbai, due to old age.

List of compositions

Music for solo piano
 Toccata No. 1 in Raag Bahar (c. 1950s)
Sonata (1952)
 Introduction and Retrograde (1959)
 Fantasia and Fugue in C (1999)
 Rhapsody on "Agni Varsha" (2007)
 Gujarati Nursery (2010)

Chamber music

 Trio for clarinet, cello and piano (c. 1950s)
 Quintet for flute, harp, viola and two cellos (c. 1950s)
 Divertimento for bassoon and piano (1951)
 Sonata for violin and piano (1954)
 Indian Nursery: Pieces for piano four hands (1956)
 Sonatina for violin and piano (1956)
 Divertimento Pastoral for flute, oboe, two clarinets and bassoon (1957)
 Sangeet Raat: Night Music for solo flute (1964)
 Cyclic Variations for cello and harpsichord (1965)
 Kaleidoscope for prepared piano and string quartet (1965)
 Kaleidoscope for violin, viola, cello and piano (2002)
 Reverie for cello and piano (2014)
 Spring: An Awakening for string quartet (2018)

Vocal music

 Dhoon for voice and piano (c. 1950s)
 Kinguri-Vali for soprano, violin and piano (1960)
 Rudranaam for triple chorus (1973)
 Jaisalmer for unaccompanied chorus (1977)
 Vasansi Jeernani for triple chorus (1981)
 Six Seasons for unaccompanied chorus (1989)
 Tantra: Meditations for voice and piano (1994)
 Transcendence for double chorus (2002)
 Rig Veda Hymns for double chorus (2003)
 Six Seasons for soprano and piano (2009)

Music for large ensemble
 Gita Govinda for orchestra (1954)
 Concerto in One Movement for piano and strings (1955)
 Sinfonia Concertante for strings (2001)

Opera
 Agni Varsha (2017)

Feature film scores

 The Householder (1963) – background score only
 Ankur (1974)
 Nishant (1975)
 Ek Dal Mithi (c. 1976, unreleased)
 Manthan (1976)
 Bhumika (1977)
 Anugraham/Kondura (1978)
 Junoon (1979)
 36 Chowringhee Lane (1981)
 Kalyug (1981)
 Sazaye Maut (1981)
 Je Peed Parai Jaane Re (1982)
 Jaane Bhi Do Yaaro (1983)
 Mandi (1983)
 Hip Hip Hurray (1984)
 Mohan Joshi Haazir Ho! (1984)
 Tarang (1984)
 Aghaat (1985) – song only
 Khamosh (1985)
 Massey Sahib (1985) – uncredited
 Surkhiyaan (1985)
 Trikaal (1985)
 Mazhab (1986, released 1996)
 Mohre (1987)
 Pestonjee (1987)
 Susman (1987)
 Percy (1989)
 Ajooba (1991) – background score only
 Antarnaad (1991)
 Jazeere (1991)
 Kasba (1991)
 Pita (1991)
 Bekhudi (1992) – background score only
 Beta (1992) – background score only
 Chamatkar (1992) – background score only
 Ramayana: The Legend of Prince Rama (1992)
 Suraj Ka Satvan Ghoda (1992)
 Damini (1993) – background score only
 Sardar (1993)
 Droh Kaal (1994)
 Mammo (1994)
 Bangarwadi (1995)
 Naseem (1995)
 Bandish (1996) – background score only
 Ghatak (1996) – background score only
 Katha Doan Ganpatraonchi (1996) – background score only
 Sardari Begum (1996)
 The Making of the Mahatma (1996)
 Jaya Ganga (1996)
 Aaram Thamburan (1997) - excerpt from 'At the Dawn of Creation'
 Char Adhyay (1997)
 Himalay Putra (1997) – background score only
 Pardes (1997) – background score only
 China Gate (1998) – background score only
 Samar (1999)
 Dhaad (2000, released 2018)
 Hari-Bhari (2000)
 Chameli (2003) – background score only
 Escape from Taliban (2003) – background score only
 Rules: Pyaar Ka Superhit Formula (2003) – background score only
 Kahan Se Aaye Badarwa: Forgotten Showers (2005), re-released as Bhagya Na Jaane Koi (2017) – background score only
 Halla Bol (2008) – only one song

Television scores

 Khandaan (1985)
 Katha Sagar (1986) – selected episodes
 Yatra (1986)
 Tamas (1987)
 Bharat Ek Khoj (1988)
 Naqab (1988)
 Wagle Ki Duniya (1988)
 Lifeline (1991)
 Baingan Raja (c. 1990s)
 Bible Ki Kahaniyan (1993) – selected episodes		
 Banegi Apni Baat (1994)
 Sankranti (1997)

Documentary scores (selected)

 A Certain Childhood (1962)
 To Light a Candle (1964)
 Kailash at Ellora (1965)
 A City in History (1966)
 From Lagoon to Sea (1966)
 The House That Ananda Built (1967)
 An Area of Darkness (c. 1968)
 Indian Youth: An Exploration (1968)
 Water (1968)
 Creative Artists: Amrita Sher-Gil (1969)
 1002 A.D. Khajuraho (1973)
 Asia '72 (1974)
 Sarojini Naidu (1975)
 The Women of India (1975)
 A Small Family (1976)
 Nirnaya (1979)
 Touch (1979)
 Bombay: A City at Stake (1981)
 Shaping a Future (1983)
 Tata Steel: Seventy-Five Years of the Indian Steel Industry (1983)
 Nehru (1984) – certain sections scored by Alexei Kozlov
 Molly’s Wish (1985)
 Chocolate Story (1986)
 Nature Symphony (1990)
 The Love We Give for Nothing (1992)
 Prabhupada: A Lifetime in Preparation (1996)
 Purva Uttara: Past Forward (1997)

Theatre music

 Teen Takke Ka Swang (1970), directed by Ebrahim Alkazi and Fritz Bennewitz
 A Man’s a Man (1971), directed by Amal Allana
 The Caucasian Chalk Circle (1972), directed by Ebrahim Alkazi and Fritz Bennewitz
 Nisheeth (1972), directed by Shanta Gandhi
 Tughlaq (1972), directed by Ebrahim Alkazi
 Andha Yug (1974), directed by Ebrahim Alkazi
 Son-et-Lumiere: The Nehru Memorial Museum and Library (1976), directed by Ebrahim Alkazi
 Aurat Bhali Ramkali (1984), directed by Amal Allana
 Othello (1991), directed by Alyque Padamsee
 Cyrano de Bergerac (1995), directed by Jatinder Verma
 My Bollywood Summer (2005), directed by Sabera Shaik

Albums

 Preeti Sagar – "Spring Is Coming"/”All Night and Day" (1976)
 Hi! Ho! (1986)
 Music for Meditation (1993)
 Cinema Cinema (1995) – only one song
 The Elements: Earth (1995)
 The Bhagavad Gita, Vols. 1 & 2 (1996)
 Anant: The Endless (2001), re-released as The Spirit of the Upanishads (2007)
 Ritika Sahni – Ritika (2001)
 India Unlimited: The United World of Artistes (2000), re-released as Vaishnava Jana To (2005) – only one song
 Tiranga Tera Aanchal (2005)

Awards
 Lili Boulanger Memorial Fund (1957)
 Bengal Film Journalists Association Award for Music: Manthan (1976), Bhumika (1977)
 Sur Singar Samsad Award for Best Classical Score/Song (1986, 1987)
 National Film Award for Best Music Direction for Tamas (1988)
 Sangeet Natak Akademi Award for Creative and Experimental Music (1989)
 Maharashtra Rajya Puraskar (1990)
 Padma Shri (2012)

References

External links
 
 Vanraj Bhatia, Serenade, 22 March 2017.
 The Vanraj Bhatia interview: ‘My music was unique then and is perhaps unique even now’, Scroll, 1 March 2017.
 The Best of Bhatia, Deccan Herald, 24 January 2015.
 Thank you for the music, LiveMint, 26 April 2014.

1927 births
2021 deaths
Elphinstone College alumni
Alumni of the Royal Academy of Music
Recipients of the Sangeet Natak Akademi Award
Recipients of the Padma Shri in arts
Hindi film score composers
Best Music Direction National Film Award winners
Conservatoire de Paris alumni
Musicians from Mumbai
Rockefeller Fellows
Jingle composers
20th-century Indian musicians
Indian male film score composers
20th-century male musicians
Indian expatriates in France